Blastodacna mandshurica is a moth in the family Elachistidae. It is found in Russia.

References

Moths described in 1988
Blastodacna
Moths of Asia